Chartertech High School for the Performing Arts is a public charter high school for students in ninth through twelfth grades in Somers Point, Atlantic County, New Jersey, United States, that focuses on education in the performing arts. The school operates independently of the local school district under a charter granted by the New Jersey Department of Education.

As of the 2021–22 school year, the school had an enrollment of 380 students and 42.0 classroom teachers (on an FTE basis), for a student–teacher ratio of 9.0:1. There were 223 students (58.7% of enrollment) eligible for free lunch and 28 (7.4% of students) eligible for reduced-cost lunch.

History
The school opened in 1999 under a charter granted by the New Jersey Department of Education.

The Somers Point Planning Board approved a proposal in April 2010 that had been submitted by the school under which the school would spend $4 million to construct additional classrooms and a gymnasium to be completed before the conclusion of the 2011–12 school year that would allow Chartertech to accommodate as many as 400 students. Although being a performing arts high school, it took over 24 years to build a proper stage.

Awards, recognition and rankings
The school was the 179th-ranked public high school in New Jersey out of 339 schools statewide in New Jersey Monthly magazine's September 2014 cover story on the state's "Top Public High Schools".

Administration
Core members of the school's administration are:
Dr. Brian McGuire, lead person/principal, dean of students, director of special education
Jill Carson, business administrator and board secretary
Jennifer Lee, vice principal 
Erin Randolph, vice principal

References

External links 
Charter-Tech High School for the Performing Arts Web Site
Charter-Tech High School for the Performing Arts, National Center for Education Statistics

1999 establishments in New Jersey
Charter schools in New Jersey
Charter high schools in the United States
Educational institutions established in 1999
Public high schools in Atlantic County, New Jersey
Somers Point, New Jersey